The Best of Times is a 2002 Taiwanese drama film directed by Chang Tso-chi. It was entered into the 59th Venice International Film Festival. It was also selected as the Taiwanese entry for the Best Foreign Language Film at the 75th Academy Awards, but it was not nominated.

Cast 
 Wing Fan
 Kao Meng-Chieh

Accolades

See also
 List of submissions to the 75th Academy Awards for Best Foreign Language Film
 List of Taiwanese submissions for the Academy Award for Best Foreign Language Film

References

External links
 

2002 films
2002 drama films
Taiwanese drama films
2000s Mandarin-language films
Taiwanese-language films
Hakka Chinese-language films
Hakka culture in Taiwan